The Kingdom of Serbs, Croats and Slovenes was represented at the inaugural Winter Olympic Games in 1924 in Chamonix, France with a delegation of four competitors.

Cross-country skiing

References

 

Nations at the 1924 Winter Olympics
1924
Olympics, Winter